Adeva! is the debut album by American singer Adeva, released in 1989. The album features the singles "Respect" (UK No. 17), "Musical Freedom (Free At Last)" (UK No. 22), "Warning!" (UK No. 17), "I Thank You" (UK No. 17), "Beautiful Love" (UK No. 57) and "Treat Me Right" (UK No. 62). The album was particularly successful in the United Kingdom, where it reached No. 6 in the UK Albums Chart and was certified platinum by the British Phonographic Industry for UK sales exceeding 300,000 copies.

Critical reception

In a retrospective review for AllMusic, Alex Henderson gave the album four out of five stars and praised "big-voiced" Adeva's "aggressive, gospel-influenced belting", calling it "a throwback to the days of Gloria Gaynor, Grace Jones, Linda Clifford, and Loleatta Holloway.

Track listing

Note
 Tracks 11–13 on CD only.

Note
 Although titled differently, track 12 is the same remix as track 13 on the UK CD version.

Personnel
Adapted from the album's liner notes.

Adeva – lead vocals
Carmen Brown – background vocals
Michael Cameron – drum programming
Roger Cozine – keyboards
Rod Goode – drum programming
Keith Jacks – guitar, assistant engineer
Tony Jenkins – background vocals
Frank Jones – background vocals
Kevin Lewis – keyboards
Andrew MacPherson – photography
Brenda Mickens – background vocals
Russ Kip Moore – saxophone, engineer
Troy Patterson – keyboards, drum programming, background vocals
Pablovia Raban – mixing
Rico Tyler – keyboards, drum programming

Charts and certifications

Weekly charts

Year-end charts

Certifications

References

External links
Adeva! (UK version) at Discogs
Adeva! (US version) at Discogs

1989 debut albums
Cooltempo Records albums
Chrysalis Records albums
Capitol Records albums
Adeva albums